"Wish I Didn't Love You" is a song by American rock singer Chloe Kohanski. It is Chloe's coronation single following her victory on the thirteenth season of the singing competition The Voice. The song debuted and peaked at number sixty-nine on Billboard Hot 100 for the chart dated January 6, 2018.

Track listing

Charts

References

External links

2017 singles
2017 songs
Pop ballads
Republic Records singles
Song articles with missing songwriters